Rhamnetin is an O-methylated flavonol, a type of chemical compound. It can be isolated from cloves. 

The structure of the molecule was discovered by Austrian chemist Josef Herzig (1853–1924).

Glycosides 
Rhamnetin is the aglycone of xanthorhamnin.

O-methylated flavonols
Catechols